Harald Beyer may refer to:

 Harald Beyer (literary historian) (1891–1960), Norwegian literary historian
 Harald Beyer (politician) (born 1964), Chilean politician